China Everbright Limited  is a Hong Kong-based financial services company in asset management, investment and merchant bank in the Greater China region, including Mainland China and Hong Kong. It is part of the China Everbright Group, a state-owned enterprise operated under the supervision of the State Council of the People's Republic of China (via Central Huijin Investment and the Ministry of Finance).

China Everbright Limited is considered a red chip stock on the Hong Kong Stock Exchange.

History
The predecessor of the company was founded on 25 August 1972 in Hong Kong as Intercontinental Housing Development Limited, renamed IHD Holdings in 1987. In 1994 it was taken over by China Everbright Group and renamed China Everbright-IHD Pacific Limited. On 18 July 1997, the business inherited from IHD was ended, the company was renamed China Everbright Limited, the current name. On the same day, a 20% stake of China Everbright Bank was injected from the parent company, China Everbright Group, followed by International Bank of Asia on 2 August. On 18 July 1999, Everbright Limited acquired a 49% stake of Everbright Securities from the parent company.

In 2002, a 35% stake of Standard Life (Asia) Limited was sold to Standard Life. In 2003, SeaBright Asset Management Limited was founded, a joint venture with Seagate Global Advisors. In 2000s Everbright Limited acted as sponsor in numbers of firm listing in Hong Kong Stock Exchange, for example, Zijin Mining in 2003.

In 2011, a 51% stake of Everbright Securities (International) was sold to Everbright Securities, Everbright Limited remained a minority shareholder of Everbright Securities, while Everbright Group is the largest shareholder.

In 2016, the company acquired the concession of Tirana International Airport, which runs until 2027. The company was the largest shareholder of China Aircraft Leasing Group Holdings.

Business areas

References

External links
 

Companies listed on the Hong Kong Stock Exchange
Financial services companies established in 1997
Government-owned companies of China
Financial services companies of China
China Everbright Group